Garrey is a both a surname and given name. Notable people with the name Garrey include:

People with the surname:
George H. Garrey (1875–1957), American mining geologist
Walter E. Garrey (1874–1951), American physiologist

People with the given name:
Garrey Carruthers (born 1939), American politician and academic 
Garrey Dawson, British chef 
Garrey Wynd (born 1946), former Australian rules footballer

See also
Garry (disambiguation)
Gerry (disambiguation)
Gary (disambiguation)